Carlos Rodolfo Rotondi (born 12 March 1997) is an Argentine professional footballer who plays as a winger for Cruz Azul.

Career
Rotondi began his career with Newell's Old Boys, signing in 2015. He made his senior debut on 11 June 2017 in the Copa Argentina, featuring for twenty-five minutes of a 4–1 victory over Central Norte. Over a year later, Rotondi made his first appearance in professional league football during an away loss to Godoy Cruz on 27 August 2018. In February 2019, Rotondi was loaned to San Luis of Primera B de Chile. He scored his first senior goal on 16 March 2019 against Santiago Wanderers, a club he would later join on loan in January 2020; with them now in the Primera División having won promotion.

Career statistics

References

External links

1997 births
Living people
Argentine footballers
Argentine expatriate footballers
Footballers from Córdoba, Argentina
Argentine people of Italian descent
Association football wingers
Argentine Primera División players
Primera B de Chile players
Chilean Primera División players
Newell's Old Boys footballers
San Luis de Quillota footballers
Santiago Wanderers footballers
Defensa y Justicia footballers
Expatriate footballers in Chile
Argentine expatriate sportspeople in Chile